"Baby, Come to Me", a love ballad from Patti Austin's 1981 album Every Home Should Have One, was her duet with James Ingram. It was written by Rod Temperton (formerly of Heatwave). The song was released as a single in April 1982, peaking at No. 73 on the Billboard Hot 100. Several months later, American soap opera General Hospital began to feature the song heavily as the love theme for character Luke Spencer. It was re-released in October and reached No. 1 on the chart in February 1983.

History

The song was performed by Patti Austin and James Ingram, with Michael McDonald contributing background vocals. Produced by Quincy Jones, the song appears on Austin's 1981 album, Every Home Should Have One. When first released as a single, it charted on the US Billboard Hot 100 for just four weeks, peaking at number 73 on May 8, 1982.

Later that year, it gained new exposure as the romantic theme song for Luke Spencer, a leading character on the ABC soap opera General Hospital. ABC received so many inquiries about the song that Warner Bros. decided to re-release "Baby, Come to Me" as a single. On October 16, 1982, the song re-entered the Billboard Hot 100. It reached No. 1 on February 19, 1983, where it stayed for two weeks, and spent seven months on the Hot 100. It also hit No. 1 on the Adult Contemporary chart in early 1983 and reached No. 11 in the UK in March 1983.

Personnel
 Lead and Backing Vocals: James Ingram
 Lead and Backing Vocals: Patti Austin
 Backing vocals: Michael McDonald
 Drums: John Robinson
 Bass: Eddie Watkins, Jr.
 Guitar: Steve Lukather
 Keyboards: Greg Phillinganes
 Fender Rhodes: Richard Tee
 Synthesizers: Greg Phillinganes, David Foster, Michael Boddicker, Rod Temperton
 Percussion: Paulinho Da Costa
 Arrangement: Rod Temperton
 Recording engineer: Bruce Swedien
 Mixing: Bruce Swedien
 Mastering: Bernie Grundman

Covers
Among artists who have covered the song are:
Shirley Bassey
 Dalida
 Laura Fygi
 Daryl Hall and Kenny G
 Alexander O'Neal and Cherrelle
 Captain and Tennille
 Stephanie Winslow
 Eliane Elias (Love Stories, 2019)

Charts

Weekly charts

Year-end charts

All-time charts

See also
List of Billboard Hot 100 number-one singles of 1983
List of number-one adult contemporary singles of 1983 (U.S.)
Rise (instrumental), another song popularized by connection with Luke Spencer on General Hospital

References

External links
 

1981 songs
1982 singles
1983 singles
James Ingram songs
Patti Austin songs
Love themes
Contemporary R&B ballads
Billboard Hot 100 number-one singles
Songs written by Rod Temperton
Song recordings produced by Quincy Jones
Male–female vocal duets
1980s ballads
General Hospital
Qwest Records singles